Wakai (written: 若井) is a Japanese surname. Notable people with the surname include:

, Japanese karateka
Glenn Wakai (born 1967), American politician
, Japanese footballer
Atsuko Wakai (若井 敦子, Wakai Atsuko, born 1971) Japanese practitioner
Wakai ki (若い樹) (lit. 'A Young Tree') Japanese film directed

See also
Wakai Station, a railway station in Kōchi Prefecture, Japan

Japanese-language surnames